Ernest Maupain (1869–1944) was a French film actor who appeared in many American films during the silent era. He played the role of Professor Moriarty in the 1916 Essanay Studios film Sherlock Holmes.

Selected filmography
 The Raven (1915)
 Captain Jinks of the Horse Marines (1916)
 Sherlock Holmes (1916)
 That Sort (1916)
 The Prince of Graustark (1916)
 Max Wants a Divorce (1917)
 The Trufflers (1917)
 The Turn of the Wheel (1918)
 Face à l'Océan (1920)
 La folie du doute (1920)
 The Two Pigeons (1922)
 The Mysteries of Paris (1922)
 The Bread Peddler (1923)
 Le Miracle des loups (1924)
 The Chocolate Girl (1927)

References

Bibliography
 Amnon Kabatchnik. Sherlock Holmes on the Stage: A Chronological Encyclopedia of Plays Featuring the Great Detective. Scarecrow Press, 2008.

External links

1869 births
1944 deaths
French male film actors
French expatriate male actors in the United States